Martin Bradley (born 1931) is a British painter.

Bradley was born in London, England. He attended St Paul's School, but ran away to sea aged 14, serving as a cabin boy. Martin married his first wife in the 1950s and has two children and three grandchildren from this marriage. He married his second wife in 1975. He held his first solo exhibition in 1954 at Gimpel Fils, then exhibiting at Gallery One and the Redfern Gallery in London. In the early 1960s, he exhibited at the Rive Gauche Gallery in Paris a number of times.

Martin Bradley is known for abstract and symbolic artworks, influenced by the calligraphy of China and Japan, as well as Buddhism, to which he converted.

Bradley's works are held in the Tate Gallery collections in London, UK, and the Museum of Modern Art in New York, USA. His works have been collected by Dame Barbara Hepworth, Sir Roland Penrose, and Sir Herbert Read. He has been exhibited by the Paisnel Gallery in London.

References

1931 births
Living people
Artists from London
People educated at St Paul's School, London
20th-century English painters
21st-century English painters
21st-century English male artists
Abstract painters
English Buddhists
Buddhist artists